Sverdlove, renamed Kholodne in 2016, is an urban-type settlement in Makiivka Municipality, Donetsk Raion in Donetsk Oblast of eastern Ukraine. Population:

Demographics
Native language as of the Ukrainian Census of 2001:
 Ukrainian 18.9%
 Russian 80.23%
 Belarusian 0.19%
 Polish 0.6%

References

Urban-type settlements in Donetsk Raion